Leslie Albert Gibaud (28 June 1901 – 22 August 1983) was an Australian rules footballer who played with Fitzroy in the Victorian Football League (VFL).

Notes

External links 

1901 births
1983 deaths
Australian rules footballers from Melbourne
Fitzroy Football Club players
People from Fitzroy, Victoria